Hypselodoris imperialis is a species of sea slug, a dorid nudibranch, a marine gastropod mollusk in the family Chromodorididae.

Distribution
This species was described from Hawaii. It is reported from many locations in the tropical Western Pacific Ocean from Australia to Hawaii.

References

Chromodorididae
Gastropods described in 1860